Santa Maria degli Angeli is a church in central Parma. It is also called Santa Maria dell'Addolorata or  Santa Maria del Bambin Gesù.

History
An oratory on the site was erected for the veneration of an icon painted on the wall of the city, near the Porta Nuova. In 1562–1569, a church was built under the designs of the architect  Giovanni Francesco Testa. In 1686, a monastery of Capuchin Clare nuns was founded adjacent to the church by the Duke Ranuccio II Farnese. The monastery was suppressed in 1810.

The cupola was frescoed starting in 1588 by Giovanni Battista Tinti  with an Assumption of Mary surrounded by the biblical figures of Mozes, Ezekiel, Gideon, and Jesse. The paintings on the walls of the nave were completed by Alessandro and his brother, Pier Antonio Bernabei. The main altarpiece is a Pieta by the Venetian Sebastiano Ricci.

References

Roman Catholic churches completed in 1569
16th-century Roman Catholic church buildings in Italy
Renaissance architecture in Parma
Roman Catholic churches in Parma
1569 establishments in Italy